In the mathematical discipline known as functional analysis, a Triebel–Lizorkin space is a generalization of many standard function spaces such as Lp spaces and Sobolev spaces.

External links 
 Homogeneity Property of Besov and Triebel-Lizorkin Spaces

References 

.

Functional analysis